ADH may refer to:

Science
 Adipic acid dihydrazide, a chemical compound
 Alcohol dehydrogenase, an enzyme
 Antidiuretic hormone or vasopressin
 Atypical ductal hyperplasia, a lesion of the breast

Sports
 Aalborg DH, a Danish handball club

Transportation 
 Ada Municipal Airport, Oklahoma, US
 Aldan Airport,  Russia
 Air One, an Italian airline
 Andheri railway station, Mumbai, India

Other uses 
 Adhola dialect of Southern Luo, spoken in Uganda